Parisville may refer to the following places:
 Parisville, Michigan
 Parisville, Quebec